Botswana Defence Force XI Football Club is a football club from Botswana based in Mogoditshane and playing home games in Gaborone. It is the club of the Botswana Defence Force, being composed mostly of military players. As of 2007, players were eligible to play for the club once they become cadets. In 2016, the club reduced the number of civilian players on the team citing financial concerns.

History
BDF XI were founded in 1978, a year after the Botswana Defence Force came into existence. BDF XI have won the Botswana Premier League seven times, most recently in 2004.

Honors
Botswana Premier League: 7
1981, 1988, 1989, 1991, 1997, 2002, 2004
Botswana Challenge Cup: 3
1989, 1998, 2004

Performance in CAF competitions
CAF Champions League: 2 appearances
1998 – Preliminary Round
2003 – Preliminary Round

 African Cup of Champions Clubs: 4 appearances
1982 – First Round
1989 – First Round
1990 – Preliminary Round
1992 – Preliminary Round

CAF Confederation Cup: 2 appearances
2005 – First Round
2015 – Preliminary Round

CAF Cup: 1 appearance
2002 – Second Round

CAF Cup Winners' Cup: 1 appearance
1999 – First Round

Players

References

Football clubs in Botswana
Association football clubs established in 1978
Football clubs in Gaborone
1978 establishments in Botswana
Military association football clubs